Mapenduma may refer to:

Mapenduma, a district in Nduga Regency, Papua province, Indonesia
Mapenduma hostage crisis in Mapenduma, Jayawijaya (1996)